Rosalie Aten Konou is the Marshall Islands' first female lawyer. She has held the positions of head of the island nation's Legal Aid Office and Assistant Attorney General.

See also 

 List of first women lawyers and judges in Oceania

References

Living people
Year of birth missing (living people)
21st-century Marshallese women
Women lawyers

Marshallese lawyers